Fernando Ulson Batul (May 24, 1969 – May 22, 2006) is a Filipino journalist and politician, working as a radio broadcaster for the DYPR in Puerto Princesa, Palawan, was known for his commentaries that were critical of politicians, military officials, rival radio commentators and others. Most of his remarks were made towards the mayor's administration about the quality of governance in Palawan. He had many supporters, but he angered many with his commentaries. He was eventually assassinated and shot six times by men on motorcycles while he was driving, just weeks after grenades were found in his home.

Early life 
Fernando "Dong" Ulson Batul was born on May 24, 1969, in Puerto Princesa, Palawan. He was the youngest seven children of Condrada Ulson of Suba, Cuyo and Alejandro Batul of Pawa, Cuyo. His eldest siblings are Nelda, Alicia, Wilfredo, Merlina, Felina, and Letecia "Letty". At his young age, it has been imprinted in his mind that being a Cuyunon and a Palaweño is an honor and privilege that he should value and thank for. So he grew up with a love for his hometown, proud of their culture and has concern for the future of the community he belongs to.

Education and Student-Leadership

Education 
Although they lack of material things, Dong's parents tried to educate all their children until they graduated from college because they believed this would be the key to their good future.

Dong finished his primary school at East Central School on 1982 and his secondary school at Palawan National School on 1986. Batul attended Palawan State College where he graduated with a Political Science degree.

Student-Leadership 
While at Palawan National School, many people see Dong having the qualities of being a leader. He has been an official of various organizations inside and outside the school, and became active in talks and issues that would affect students like him.

Dong's leadership fully emerged when he stepped into college. At PSU he honed his ability to give speeches, debate issues, and deal with people from different social levels. It is also here that Dong's activism was shaped by various issues for the protection and promotion of the rights and welfare of fellow students such as the improvement of facilities of the university, the increasing fares of vehicles traveling here, and more. Here arose a new Dong Batul with a firm stance, with the courage to fight for and defend his principles and truths, and with concern for what is happening to the society he belongs to. 

With some of his friends, they established a political party in PSU that they called Simbolo ng Kapatiran (SIKAP). In 1989, a year before he graduated, Dong was elected as the President of the PSU Student Council—the highest and prestigious position for a student like him. Here he left a legacy as one of the greatest student-leader of the school's history. 

Other than campus politics, Dong is also active in other civic organizations where he became an official—if not the president—like Palawan Movement for Educational Advancement (PALMEA), Student Assistance Committee—Youth Community Service Club, Teatro Iskwela, Alyansa ng mga Kabataan Lingkod sa Aping Sambayanan (AKLAS), Junior Paliamentary Organization (JPO), and more. 

Dong never forgot the spiritual aspect of his life like what his parents taught him because he became an active member and official of Catholic Charismatic Youth Ministry and Cursillos in Christianity. In these church organizations his faith to our Lord strengthened. 

In his college years, many said that he will go far when the time comes.

Career

Crocodile Farming Institute 
After college, he could not find a job so for a few months he became tricycle driver. But with the help of his friends, he entered the Crocodile Farming Institute (CFI) which was before a project of the Philippine government's Department of Environment and Natural Resources (DENR) and the Japan International Cooperation Agency (JICA) under the supervision of Gerardo Ortega as the project manager.

He started as a clerk, but later he became an Information Officer of the said project. In the span of ten years (1990-2000), the CFI went famous not only in the Philippines but on other countries too. Because of the vitality and beauty their information campaign, one of the firsts tourist destination—local and tourists—is the CFI in the whole Palawan.

As an Information Officer, he used his skill in speech on giving accurate information about the importance of the two species of crocodiles (Crocodylus mindorensis and Crocodylus porosus) that are threatened to extinct and the purposes and tasks of this project. He also had the opportunity to explore different municipalities and cities in his country in this kind of issue.

Bunyog Palawan 
Although he was busy with his work, Dong continued his activism. In the years 1991–1992, the gambling game jueteng was popular in the city of Puerto Princesa and some municipalities  of Palawan. The church and other sectors strongly opposed it, and he was one of the few ordinary citizens who spoke out against it.

In these times, with his friend Edmond Gastanes, established the Bunyog Palawan, an alternative newspaper to give way on revealing important social issues like jueteng.

With their own money, they manage to give a regular circulation of the paper to the province for a span of about five years. These 2,000 copies are given not only to the City of Puerto Princesa but also to other nearby municipalities.

Because of Bunyog Palawan, Gastanes and Dong was charged with libel by the former Mayor Clarito Demaala IV of the town of Narra allegedly because of his involvement in jueteng. The case that also asks for a PHP 5 million fine for moral damages was filed at the Regional Trial Court under the presence of Judge Duhaylungsod.

The attorneys of Dong and Gastanes appealed to the Department of Justice about this case and after about two years, the DOJ gave a memorandum to the City Prosecutor to withdraw the case because of lack of merit.

After the charges had been filed and before the court dismissed the case, many had advised Dong to stop his regular publishing of Bunyog Palawan, to silence his mouth, and just give his time to his souvenir items and t-shirts selling to the CFI. But none of these had stopped his activism. Many people had been astonished by his bravery, not typical to a Cuyunon, who is quiet and reserved.

Singles for Christ 
It was in the year 1995 when Dong and the Singles for Christ has intersected paths, as the organization was only starting in Palawan. Due to his religious nature, it is not shocking that Dong has gotten interest with the organization. He was one of the Palaweño pioneers of the organization. And like the other organizations he had joined that he later on led, he became the Household Head, then Unit Head, and then Chapter Head on the whole Puerto Princesa. As a member and an official of the organization, Dong and his colleagues visited municipalities in Palawan as part of their evangelization and to establish SFC ministries there. In 1999, Dong and two other colleagues were sent to State of Israel where in a span of 2 months, they performed a so-called Christian Life Program for the Christian youths there.

Kulog at Kidlat 
 

He began his work in the media in the 1990s when he was just a clerk in Crocodile Farm [Institute,] Inc.

On February 1, 1998, Dong's program "Kulog at Kidlat", a DYPR program, soared to the skies of the whole Palawan. The program's intention is to give ordinary citizens a chance to talk and hear about the truth in the social issues about the government anomalies. It also gives people a voice to convey their grievances, needs, views, reactions, and thoughts to those concerned.  Batul became popular and gained many listeners because he showed them that he was just like them.

His program became a word-of-mouth of many Palaweños and became a part of their everyday lives.  Batul was known to report on alleged government corruption and nepotism as he was highly critical of the city government.

Because of this program, another libel case was filed against him by mayor Edward Hagedorn that asks for PHP 100 million for moral damages. He was also detained in the National Bureau of Investigation for days. 

Because of the success of this public service, he and the RGMA-DYSP leaders decided to establish the Kulog at Kidlat Foundation, Inc. or KKFI on May 24, 1999. Under his leadership the KKFI has collected funds and help for the every Palaweño's needs.

Para sa Diyos at sa Bayan
In 2001, he faced another challenge and mission. Attorney Victorino Dennis Socrates, the son of Salvador Socrates, chose to run for the mayorship in Puerto Princesa, and he needs a candidate  for the role of vice mayor. After prayers and consultations,  he and his party decided to invite Batul. 

At first he rejected the offer because of his doubt that he would surely be accused by Hagedorn's party that he is attacking him in Kulog at Kidlat because he has ambition to enter politics.  He decided to run for vice mayor of Puerto Princesa in 2001 after many consultations and prayers, with the slogan Para sa Diyos at sa Bayan (For God and Country). He had won on the election. However, when he ran for a second time, he lost to Lucilo Bayron due to an election protest against him.

Bastonero

After his defeat for vice mayor, he continued in radio with a program called "Bastonero" at DYPR, which was owned by the Palawan Broadcasting Corporation.

Death 
Fernando Batul was shot six times by men on motorcycles just 200 meters away from the radio station on May 22, 2006. Just a few weeks before that on April 24, 2006, Batul found two grenades on his property with a threat in the form of a letter pinned to his gate. The letter warned him to "hold his tongue or else his family would suffer harsh consequences." More than ten members of Batul's family were inside his house when they found the grenades. Police were able to detonate them without any harm. His death may have been contributed to his commentaries, which could have sometimes offended local officials.

He sustained 12 gunshot wounds- 4 in the face, 4 in the chest, 3 in the back and 1 in the side, and declared dead on arrival at the Cooperative Hospital.

Mayor Edward Hagedorn, one of the officials Batul would talk about, denied involvement with the murder right away and even offered a 2 million peso reward for anyone who could capture his killers. Four witnesses were able to identify Golifardo, a police officer, as one of Batul's killers and he was taken in as a suspect days after Batul's killing. Investigators have been trying to build a case against him since, as he is the prime suspect. Although he tested negative for gunpowder burns, a whole 72 hours had passed since the killing and Golifardo could have been to many places before he had to be tested. Not five hours after Batul's death, Golifardo was listed in a passenger seat leaving Puerto Princesa and going to Manila. Philippine National Police Chief Director, General Arturo Lomibao, to ensure an alright case against Galifardo, while trying to track down the other suspect who was allegedly driving the getaway motorcycle. However, in April 2011, the courts acquitted Galifardo of the crime. Evidence supported that he had left the day of the killing to attend a child support hearing in Camp Crame. With Galifardo having his innocence, the case of the killing of Batul is still left wide open.

Context 
Before Batul was murdered, according to the National Union of Journalists of the Philippines, 78 reporters were listed that were killed since democracy in the country was restored in 1986. Safety of journalists in the Philippines was becoming more of a concern as the Brussels-based International Federation of Journalists said the situation "has gone from bad to worse" after a tabloid photographer was murdered and hours later another journalist was beaten. A total of 120 journalists have been killed in the Philippines in line of duty since 1986 and Batul was the 67th. That means 66 journalists had been murdered before Batul in the Philippines before him in just 20 years. The month before the murder of Batul, he and his sister found grenades in his residence, but police were able to safely detonate them in the yard to prevent any harm. Two other journalists, who were friends, received threats prior to Batul's killing and they fled Palawan because they were worried about their safety. Also, the station where Batul worked, DYPR, once had to hire a security guard to keep angry listeners from attacking a different radio commentator.

Impact 
Batul's death has impacted people and the society in many ways, from keeping people in hiding and trying to convince their innocence, to people fleeing and striking fear into other journalists. Letty Batul, Fernando Batul's sister, has described that since her brother's killing, many campaign journalists have fled the area. She also pointed out that the murder of her brother and another popular journalist, Gerry Ortega, had silenced serious whistleblowing journalism in the area. Batul's murder is still somewhat of a mystery as people are still questioning who really was behind the murder today. In 2013, Edward Hagedorn was still trying to convince people that he had no connection in the murders of Batul and Ortega. He compared his own situation as someone who has not gone into hiding with others who had fled, like the Reyes brothers who were still in hiding since evidence connected them to the murder of Ortega.

Reactions 
On May 29, 2006, Koïchiro Matsuura, director-general of UNESCO, condemned the murder of Fernando "Dong" Batul. In his statement, Matsuura demanded authorities bring the culprits to justice. He said, "It is completely unacceptable that murder be used to silence opinions. Such violence targets not only its individual victims but society as a whole, because open debate and the basic human right of freedom of expression are indispensable fundamental components of democracy and rule of law." as said by Mr. Matsuura while giving his speech on the condemnation of Batul.

Bishop Pedro Arigo of Puerto Princesa dedicated World Communications Day, May 28, to Batul who was active in Church movements. Father Eugene Elivera, who was the director of the local Church's Social Action and Special Concerns office, said on May 26 that all masses that Sunday would be dedicated to the slain Batul.

See also
 Crocodile farming in the Philippines

References

1969 births
2006 deaths
Assassinated Filipino journalists
People from Puerto Princesa
Filipino radio journalists
Filipino Roman Catholics
Journalists killed in the Philippines